Barodi may refer to:

 Barodi, Bhopal, a village in Bhopal, India
 Barodi, Jind, a village in Haryana, India